Largs Bay may mean:

 Largs, Scotland, and its associated bay, Largs Bay
 Largs Bay, South Australia, a suburb, beach and jetty
 RFA Largs Bay (L3006), a ship